Ascoidea is a superfamily of mites. , four families are listed by the Integrated Taxonomic Information System:
Ameroseiidae
Antennochelidae
Ascidae
Melicharidae

References

Mesostigmata